Route 19 is a secondary highway, that runs along the shoreline of the Northumberland Strait in Queens County, Prince Edward Island, Canada. There are two lanes, one going in either direction. The highway begins in the community of Desable and ends in the town of Cornwall via Rocky Point.

Points of interest
Argyle Shore Provincial Park
Port La-Joye / Fort Amherst, National Historic Site

Route 19A

Route 19A (also known as Canoe Cove Road and Long Creek Road) is a secondary provincial highway located in Queens County, Prince Edward Island, Canada. The highway begins in Canoe Cove as a more direct route towards Cornwall, as Route 19 veers off towards Rocky Point. Route 19A meets up with route 19 again just before crossing the West River into Meadowbank.

References

Prince Edward Island provincial highways
Roads in Queens County, Prince Edward Island